is a Japanese adult visual novel developed and published by Lump of Sugar. The game first released on January 27, 2012, it was then later ported to PlayStation Portable, entitled , and released on March 28, 2013 by Alchemist. The PSP version removes the explicit scenes and loses the rating 15 or older, but adds a new opening and the new main female character named Sorano. Lump of Sugar later went on to produce a fan disc called  released on Comiket 82 in 2012. The fan disc is set after the events of the main game. A manga adaptation, titled  began serialization in Monthly Comic Alive by Media Factory.

Gameplay

Alike a typical visual novel game, the amount of gameplay is extremely minimal. The game gives the player a well-rounded perspective of the characters through the use of dialogue boxes that narrate the character's voice as well as their thoughts and emotions. As the game progresses, the player will reach a point where the players will choose an alternate direction between routes. The PC version contains adult material scenes, depicting the protagonist having sex with the various heroines.

In the PSP port, it removes any scenes that involve sexual interaction between characters, it also contains additional scenarios and adds a new main female character, Sorano, the protagonist's younger sister.

Plot

Story
Hiroto is a prince from the Kingdom of Eleutheria on the small far-away planet of Fadenfrus. He was tired of spending his days in the royal palace and yearned for a school life like those on Earth, where his mother had once attended. His wish came true when he was allowed to attend Konoegahara Gakuen in Junesis, a country well known for its superior education system. However, the school only had 7 students (including himself) and was on the brink of closure since it was being targeted by officials. He decided to oppose the country to save the school and protect the school life that he had longed for… but moreover, the ulterior motive for him being sent to Earth was to take over Junesis!

Playable characters

Hiroto is the male protagonist of the game.

Sorano is the female protagonist of the game. She is Hiroto's younger sister. This character is only playable on the PSP version of the game.

Seven Stars

 Voiced by: Yuka Kotorii (PC), Natsumi Takamori (PSP)
Akari is the first heroine met by Hiroto, she is the school director's granddaughter.

 Voiced by: Usa Fujisaki (PC), Chiyo Osaki (PSP)
Annemarie is a cute girl who is an exchange student from Switzerland. She enjoys baking.

 Voiced by: Rokka Kitami (PC), Ryoko Ono (PSP)
Hinayu is one of the teachers teaching at Konoegahara Gakuen, she is quite shy at times. Despite her small stature, she is a senior classmate.

 Voiced by: Yuri Bara (PC), Misato Fukuen (PSP)
Uzuki is a high spirited, energetic girl who excels in sports. She likes to tease Akari.

 Voiced by: Ryōta Ōsaka (PC, PSP)
Erkenbert is Annemarie's older brother, he is an otaku.

 Voiced by: Kōta Ōshita (PC, PSP)
Shou's nickname is Harashou, he likes music.

Related media

Printed media
In 2012, a manga called Gaku Ou: The Twinkle Star Story was serialized in Comic Alive by Media Factory, which was authored by Lump of Sugar. Tatetsu Teto provides the illustrations. A visual fan book for Gaku Ou: The Royal Seven Stars was officially released on June 15, 2012, published by Enterbrain. The visual book contains material suitable for audiences over 18, and is precisely 144 pages long.

Music
All the songs, including in the PSP version, were composed by a.k.a.dRESS of Ave;new. Both the opening and ending songs were performed by Saori Sakura, titled "My Sweet Lady" and "Fluorite Diary", respectively. In the PSP game, the opening song "My Little Glory" was also sung by Saori Sakura.

References

External links
 Official website 
 Official PSP website 

2012 video games
2013 video games
Eroge
2012 manga
Japan-exclusive video games
Manga based on video games
Media Factory manga
PlayStation Portable games
Seinen manga
Video games developed in Japan
Visual novels
Windows games
Lump of Sugar games